Cornelius is a suburban town located along Lake Norman in northern Mecklenburg County, North Carolina, United States. It is a major suburb in the Charlotte metropolitan area. The population was 24,866 at the 2010 census.

History
Potts Plantation in Cornelius was listed on the National Register of Historic Places in 1998.

Geography
Cornelius is located along Lake Norman in northern Mecklenburg County. The town is approximately located at  (35.478954, −80.884532).

Cornelius is one of three towns in Mecklenburg County located north of Charlotte. Along with its sister towns – Davidson and Huntersville – Cornelius serves as a suburb to Charlotte.

Demographics

2020 census

As of the 2020 United States census, there were 31,412 people, 12,307 households, and 7,853 families residing in the town.

2000 census
At the 2000 census, there were 11,969 people, 5,113 households, and 3,374 families living in the town. The population density was 1,415.5 people per square mile (546.2/km2). There were 5,716 housing units at an average density of 676.0 per square mile (260.9/km2). The racial makeup of the town was 91.65% White, 5.62% African American, 0.21% Native American, 1.24% Asian, 0.05% Pacific Islander, 0.50% from other races, and 0.74% from two or more races. Hispanic or Latino of any race were 2.79% of the population.

Of the 5,113 households 28.1% had children under the age of 18 living with them, 56.8% were married couples living together, 6.5% had a female householder with no husband present, and 34.0% were non-families. 27.0% of households were one person and 5.2% were one person aged 65 or older. The average household size was 2.34 and the average family size was 2.87.

The age distribution was 22.4% under the age of 18, 5.8% from 18 to 24, 36.7% from 25 to 44, 27.2% from 45 to 64, and 7.9% 65 or older. The median age was 37 years. For every 100 females, there were 102.9 males. For every 100 females age 18 and over, there were 101.9 males.

According to Claritas Market Statistics, the median household income in 2010 was $83,789.

Schools and libraries

School system
The citizens of Cornelius, NC, attend the Charlotte-Mecklenburg Schools.  Elementary schools include Cornelius Elementary and JV Washam Elementary.  Middle schools include Bailey Middle School. William A. Hough High School is the zoned high school. Hough opened in August 2010 and currently serves over 2,000 students.

Private schools
 Grace Covenant Academy
 New Beginnings Christian Academy
 Phoenix Montessori Academy

Libraries
Cornelius is served by a branch of the Public Library of Charlotte and Mecklenburg County.
The library is located in the heart of Cornelius, on Catawba Avenue just east of exit 28 on I-77.

Notable people
 Erika Brown, Olympic swimmer
 Vicky Bruce, professional women's soccer player
 Kevin Conway, professional stock car racing driver
 Amber Cope, NASCAR driver
 Jerry K. Crump, soldier in the United States Army; received Medal of Honor during the Korean War
 Christian Elder, NASCAR driver
 Mark Fields, NFL cornerback
 Erik Jones, NASCAR driver
 Michael Jordan, Hall of Fame NBA basketball player (resident)
 Steve Letarte, sportscaster and former NASCAR crew chief
 Leilani Munter, former professional race car driver and environmental activist
 Ricky Rudd, NASCAR driver
 Daniel Steedman, soccer player
 Jeff Tarte, politician
 Thom Tillis, politician and businessman
 Brian Voss, PBA and United States Bowling Congress Hall of Fame bowler
 Scot Walters, NASCAR driver
 Hoyt Wilhelm, MLB pitcher and member of the National Baseball Hall of Fame

References

External links

 
 Lake Norman Chamber of Commerce
 Visit Lake Norman

Towns in Mecklenburg County, North Carolina
Towns in North Carolina